Wednesfield railway station was a station built by the Wolverhampton and Walsall Railway in 1872, and was operated by the Midland Railway from 1876 onwards. It served the Wednesfield area of Wolverhampton, and was located near to Neachells Lane.

The station closed in 1931. Although the line remained in use until the 1980s for the goods depot in Wednesfield and nearby factories.

Station site today

All evidence of the former station site and trackbed have been wiped away with redevelopment in the area and the Wednesfield Way from Neachells Lane towards Bentley Bridge Retail Park utilizes some of the trackbed. All evidence of the railway has long vanished other than the bridge supports to the north west although they now form a canal and pedestrian walkway.

References

Disused railway stations in Wolverhampton
Railway stations in Great Britain opened in 1872
Railway stations in Great Britain closed in 1931
Former Midland Railway stations